The Russian Party (RP; ; Russkaya partiya, RP) was a Russian nationalist party founded on May 17, 1991 by Viktor Korchagin. The original name was Russian Party of the RSFSR. By the spring of 1992 it had over 5 thousand members. In 1992, after an internal party conflict, Vladimir Miloserdov became party leader, although the split lasted until 1996, when Korchagin dissolved his faction. Under the party in 1993, a paramilitary unit "Russian Guard" was created, which participated in the Defense of the House of Soviets. In 1996, the Russian Party supported Zyuganov's candidacy during the presidential elections in the Russian Federation. The most active regional organizations of the Russian Party were Saint Petersburg (headed by N.N.Bondarik) and Oryol branches (headed by Igor Semenov).

The party published anti-Semitic newspapers (Russkiye Vedomosti, Rusich), and also criticized Christianity and showed sympathy for Slavic neopaganism.

Ideology 
The party advocated the annexation of adjacent territories inhabited by the Russian-speaking population to Russia (Northern Kazakhstan, Donbas, Latgale, Crimea), if they have a common border with Russia. It also supported the independence of Transnistria. At the same time, Korchagin considered the independence of the Chechen Republic of Ichkeria "the lesser evil" on condition of mutual exchange of the population. The party supported the implementation of market economic reforms while preserving the state sector of the economy and proposed the introduction of a state of emergency in order to achieve statutory goals.

References

External links 

 Russian Party (RP) Moscow
 Russian Party on Polit.ru
 Last week, Russia received two new parties at once.
Russian nationalist parties
Defunct nationalist parties in Russia
Political parties established in 1991
Political parties disestablished in 1997
Modern pagan organizations based in Russia
Modern pagan organizations established in the 1990s
Defunct modern pagan organizations